Ode to Life is an album by American jazz pianist Don Pullen and the African-Brazilian Connection recorded in 1993 for the Blue Note label.

Reception
The Allmusic review by Scott Yanow awarded the album 3 stars, stating "The music is more subdued than is usual on a Pullen disc, with the harmonies being less dissonant and the mood often melancholy and reflective but occasionally joyous. This is one of Pullen's more accessible and introspective sessions."

Track listing
All compositions by Don Pullen except as indicated
 "The Third House on the Right" (Alberto Beserra, Guilherme Franco) - 5:00 
 "Paraty" (Nilson Matta) - 9:00 
 "El Matador" - 6:29 
 "Ah, George, We Hardly Knew Ya" - 13:03 
 "Aseeko! (Get up and Dance!)" (Mor Thiam) - 11:59 
 "Anastasia/Pyramid" (Carlos Ward) - 7:06 
 "Variation on Ode to Life" - 6:02
Recorded in New York City on February 18 & 19, 1993

Personnel
Don Pullen - piano
Carlos Ward - alto saxophone, flute
Nilson Matta - bass
Guilherme Franco - timba, berimbau, percussion
Mor Thiam - djembe, tabula, rainsticks, wind chimes, vocals

References

Blue Note Records albums
Don Pullen albums
1993 albums